This is a list of area codes within Minnesota:

Area code 218, covering the northern portion of the state
Area code 320, covering about the central third of the state except for the greater Minneapolis-Saint Paul area
Area code 507, covering the southern third of the state
Area code 612, covering Minneapolis, Richfield, Fort Snelling, and Saint Anthony
Area code 651, covering Saint Paul, eastern suburbs of the Minneapolis-Saint Paul metropolitan area, and communities along the Mississippi River down to Wabasha
Area code 763, covering the northwestern suburbs of Minneapolis
Area code 952, covering the southwestern suburbs of Minneapolis plus Apple Valley and Lakeville

Communications in Minnesota
 
Minnesota
Area codes